Marsupionta is a hypothesised subclass within the Mammalia group. The existence of Marsupionta is a postulation by some researchers as a category devolving upon a notional unification between marsupials (Marsupialia, Metatheria) with the egg-laying monotremes (Monotremata, Protheria). Under this suggested classification, placental mammals (Placentalia, Eutheria) would be the sister subclass to Marsupionta. The Marsupionta hypothesis was proposed in 1947 by W.K. Gregory and has since been the subject of multiple studies. This merging of marsupials and monotremes into the hypothesized subclass of Marsupionta is contrary to the widespread belief that pouch and placental mammals share the common subclass Theria that excludes monotremes.

Evidence

Morphological evidence
Under this scheme that splits the marsupials from the monotremes, monotremes are placed by themselves in the subclass Yinotheria. The therians are characterised by a number of common derived characteristics (synapomorphies), which include among others, viviparia (the birth of live pups), the presence of teats, and several features in the skull and shoulder girdle structures.

Common morphological features of the Marsupionta exist only in the epipubic (pouch) bones. The two epipubic bones that protrude from the pelvis bone, are present in both monotremes and marsupials, but are missing in placentals. However, some primitive mammals, as well as fossil ancestors of the Cretaceous higher mammals also exhibit these bones. It can therefore be assumed that the epipubic bones were an original feature that has been reduced in today's placentals, and thus no morphological feature for the Marsupionta exists.

The majority of researchers prefer the Theria classification based on the morphologies of marsupials and monotremes.

Molecular evidence
Genetic findings regarding the correct classification scheme for marsupials and monotremes are contradictory. Comparisons of mitochondrial DNA support the Marsupionta theory, while genome sequencing speaks for the Theria hypothesis. Other studies do not come to a clear conclusion.

References

Mammal taxonomy
Marsupials
Monotremes